Bainne ("Milk") is a 2019 Irish short film directed by Jack Reynor and starring Will Poulter.  It is Reynor's directorial debut.

Cast
Will Poulter
Kelly Thornton
Toni O’Rourke
Steve Wall

Production
The film was shot entirely at Reynor's home in Ireland.

Release
Bainne premiered at the Galway Film Festival in Ireland on July 13, 2019.

References

External links
 

2019 films
Irish-language films
2019 short films
Films shot in Ireland
Irish short films
2019 directorial debut films